In the 2017–18 rugby union season, the  participated in the Pro14 competition, their inaugural appearance in the competition after losing their Super Rugby status after the 2017 season.

Personnel

Coaches and management

The Cheetahs coaching and management staff for the 2017–18 Pro14 season were:

Squad

The Cheetahs' squad for the 2017–18 Pro14 is:

Player movements

Player movements between the end of the 2017 Super Rugby season and the end of the 2017–18 Pro14 season are as follows:

Standings

The final Conference B log standings are:

Round-by-round

The table below shows the Cheetahs' progression throughout the season. For each round, their cumulative points total is shown with the conference position:

Matches

The Cheetahs' fixtures for their inaugural season in Pro14 are:

Player statistics

The Pro14 appearance record for players that represented the Cheetahs in 2017–18 is as follows:

(c) denotes the team captain. For each match, the player's squad number is shown. Starting players are numbered 1 to 15, while the replacements are numbered 16 to 23. "App" refers to the number of appearances made by the player, "Try" to the number of tries scored by the player, "Con" to the number of conversions kicked, "Pen" to the number of penalties kicked, "DG" to the number of drop goals kicked and "Pts" refer to the total number of points scored by the player.

 Ryno Eksteen, Elandré Huggett, Günther Janse van Vuuren, Johan Kotze, Hilton Lobberts, JP Smith, Ruan van Rensburg, Reinach Venter, Ntokozo Vidima and Lihleli Xoli did not make any appearances.

See also

 Cheetahs
 Pro14

References

Cheetahs (rugby union)
Cheetahs
Cheetahs
Cheetahs